Age of the Fifth Sun is the fifth studio album by Irish post-rock band God Is an Astronaut. The first single, "In the Distance Fading", was released on 12 February 2010. The album itself was available for pre-order from 16 April 2010 and released on 17 May 2010. The album art is an original painting by Dave King.

Track listing

References

2010 albums
Revive Records albums
God Is an Astronaut albums